Rif Airport  is an airport serving Ólafsvík and Hellissandur, Iceland. It is located near Rif, a coastal village in the Western Region.

Rwy 06 length includes a  displaced threshold. There is high terrain southeast of the airport.

The Rif non-directional beacon (Ident: RF) is located on the field.

See also
Transport in Iceland
List of airports in Iceland

References

 Google Earth

External links
 OurAirports - Rif Airport
 OpenStreetMap - Rif
 SkyVector - Rif Airport
 

Airports in Iceland